The ringed warbling finch (Microspingus torquatus) is a species of bird in the family Thraupidae.
It is found in Argentina, Bolivia, and Paraguay.
Its natural habitats are subtropical or tropical dry forests, subtropical or tropical dry shrubland, and subtropical or tropical high-altitude shrubland.

References

ringed warbling finch
Birds of Argentina
Birds of the Bolivian Andes
ringed warbling finch
Taxonomy articles created by Polbot